The Basilica of St. Josaphat, located in the Lincoln Village neighborhood of Milwaukee, Wisconsin, United States, in the Archdiocese of Milwaukee, is one of 82 minor basilicas found in the United States. In its grandeur and opulence it is an excellent example of the so-called Polish Cathedral style of church architecture found in the Great Lakes region of North America. Modeled after St. Peter's Basilica in Rome, it features one of the largest copper domes in the world. It is listed on the National Register of Historic Places and is a designated Milwaukee Landmark.

Dedication 
The Basilica of St. Josaphat was dedicated to Josaphat Kuncevyc, a Ruthenian martyr and saint of the Roman Catholic Church, as well as of the Ukrainian Greek Catholic Church.

History 
Poles began trickling into Milwaukee in the 1840s, but the flow increased after the Civil War until their numbers were next only to the German-Americans. In 1866 Saint Stanislaus parish was founded - the first urban Polish parish in the U.S. St. Stanislaus branched off Josaphat's congregation in 1888. Josaphat's first church building burned in 1889. They rebuilt, but in 1896, when the parish church proved to be too small, Pastor Wilhelm Grutza commissioned a prominent church architect of the late 19th and early 20th centuries, Erhard Brielmaier. Like a number of other Polish churches in the so-called Polish Cathedral style, such as St. Mary of the Angels in Chicago or Immaculate Heart of Mary in Pittsburgh, the architectural plans for the new edifice were intentionally modeled on St. Peter's Basilica.

As the design neared completion, Father Grutza learned that the U.S. Post Office and Customs House in Chicago was being razed. He purchased the 200,000 tons of salvage material for $20,000 and had it delivered to Milwaukee on 500 railroad flatcars, where parishioners were waiting to begin construction.

The Basilica was formally dedicated in 1901 by Archbishop Francis Xavier Katzer with 4,000 people in attendance. Once completed, it met the requirements of Milwaukee's growing Polish Catholic population by seating 2,400 members and was the city's largest church. Artist Tadeusz Żukotyński painted the first painting in the church, The Martyrdom of St. Josaphat, in 1904.

Decoration on the interior was completed in 1928 by artists Conrad Schmitt and Gonippo Raggi. Detailed oil paintings depicting biblical scenes adorned the walls and inner dome, while ornamental plasterwork finished in gold leaf set the columns, and ornate stained glass covered the windows.

In 1929, Pope Pius XI designated St. Josaphat Church as the third minor basilica in the United States, marking it as a place of pilgrimage, special devotion, and historical significance.

An electrical fire in 1940 caused extensive smoke damage to the interior, and a lightning storm in 1947 dislodged several large blocks of stone from the base of the dome. The need for repairs could no longer be ignored. Structural maintenance and renovation of the murals began in earnest from 1948 through 1951.

Strong winds in 1986 tore a sheet of copper from the dome and severe water damage occurred. Financial assistance in repairs was the impetus for partnerships with the Franciscan Order, along with several prominent businessmen from the Polish community. This led to the establishment of the St. Josaphat Basilica Foundation in 1991 and allowed large scale restoration work, again by Conrad Schmitt Studios, to begin.

Construction 
The original plans drawn by architect Erhard Brielmaier called for brick construction. When it was decided that salvage material from the demolished Chicago Federal Building was to be used, Erhard had to use reverse planning in order to incorporate stone as the primary building material.

Each block was carefully measured and numbered for a best fit in the new design and hardly any stone was re-cut or went to waste. A large field nearby was used for material storage and sorting as it came off the railroad flatcars.

Six large granite columns from the Federal Building, along with their carved stone capitals, were added to the plans. The original ornamental bronze railings, lighting fixtures, and doors were also to be used.

This monumental task was completed using nothing more than man and horse power, which hauled the earth to a new location along the western shore of the Kinnickinnic River.

The cornerstone was placed on July 4, 1897. Unskilled parishioners did most of the work under Erhard's careful guidance and direction. Hired help from among the poor also contributed, when limited church funds allowed.

Since domestic Portland cement was of unknown quality at the time, German Dyckerhoff cement was imported for use in the foundation, while old railroad ties served as reinforcement. Heavy steel rails were also used in the concrete footings for the eight piers that supported the  dome.

On July 21, 1901, a high mass presided over by Archbishop Francis Xavier Katzer marked the formal completion and dedication of the basilica.

Interior decoration
The first mural that was painted for this church was The Martyrdom of St. Josaphat in 1904 by the artist Zukotynski and is found directly behind and above the altar. Most of the other murals found in the church were painted by Gonippo Raggi. Conrad Schmitt Studios later restored the interior of the Basilica to its 1926 decorative grandeur, originally executed by Conrad Schmitt Studios and Roman artist Professor Gonippo Raggi, and restored the Basilica's stained glass windows imported from Austria in 1902.

See also
List of churches in the Roman Catholic Archdiocese of Milwaukee
Lincoln Village, City of Milwaukee, Wisconsin
Polish Cathedral style
Wacław Kruszka
Tadeusz Żukotyński
List of tallest buildings in Milwaukee

References

External links

 Basilica of St. Josaphat
 St. Josaphat Basilica Foundation
 Interactive panoramas of The Basilica of St. Josaphat

Josaphat
Landmarks in Wisconsin
Roman Catholic churches in Milwaukee
Church buildings with domes
Polish Cathedral style architecture
Polish-American culture in Milwaukee
Churches on the National Register of Historic Places in Wisconsin
Roman Catholic churches completed in 1901
Articles containing video clips
National Register of Historic Places in Milwaukee
20th-century Roman Catholic church buildings in the United States
South Side, Milwaukee